Stephen Wilkins Jenkins (March 31, 1952December 26, 2021) was an American children's book author. He illustrated, wrote, and art-directed over 50 books.

Stephen Wilkins Jenkins was born on March 31, 1952, in Hickory, North Carolina. He received a bachelor's and master's from the school of design at North Carolina State University.

Jenkins died on December 26, 2021, in Boulder, Colorado.

Books
Duck's Breath and Mouse Pie: A Collection of Animal Superstitions (Ticknor & Fields, 1994)
Animals in Flight
What Do You Do with a Tail Like This?

As illustrator 
Deborah Lee Rose (One Nighttime Sea, Scholastic, 2003)
Valerie Worth (Pug and Other Animal Poems, FSG, 2013)
April Pulley Sayre (Squirrels Leap, Squirrels Sleep, Holt, 2016)

References

External links
 

1952 births
2021 deaths
20th-century American male writers
21st-century American male writers
People from Hickory, North Carolina